Brish Run is a tributary of Pine Creek in Luzerne County, Pennsylvania, in the United States. The stream has one unnamed tributary. The surficial geology in the vicinity of Brish Run mostly consists of Wisconsinan Till, but there is alluvium near its mouth and also bedrock in the area. The stream is being considered for wild trout designation.

Course
Brish Run begins in a relatively shallow valley in Fairmount Township. It flows south-southeast through the valley for a few tenths of a mile before gradually turning south. A short distance further downstream, it receives an extremely short unnamed tributary from the left and crosses Municipal Road. The stream continues flowing south through its valley for several tenths of a mile, passing through a small pond before turning south-southwest. A few tenths of a mile further downstream, it reaches its confluence with Pine Creek.

Tributaries
Brish Run has no named tributaries. However, it does have one unnamed tributary.

Geography and geology

The surficial geology in the vicinity of the mouth of Brish Run consists of alluvium. The rest of the stream flows through land with surficial geology consisting of a till known as Wisconsinan Till. Much of the stream's valley also has this in its surficial geology. However, there are patches of bedrock consisting of sandstone and shale.

Watershed and biology
The stream is entirely within the United States Geological Survey quadrangle of Red Rock. Its mouth is located within  of Fairmount Springs.

Brish Run is the upstream-most tributary to join Pine Creek.

Brish Run is being considered by the Pennsylvania Fish and Boat Commission for wild trout designation.

History
Brish Run was entered into the Geographic Names Information System on August 2, 1979. Its identifier in the Geographic Names Information System is 1170272.

Brish Run was surveyed by the Pennsylvania Fish and Boat Commission on July 9, 2014. It was listed as being considered for wild trout designation on April 9, 2015.

See also
Wasp Branch, next tributary of Pine Creek going downstream
List of tributaries of Fishing Creek (North Branch Susquehanna River)
List of rivers of Pennsylvania

References

Rivers of Luzerne County, Pennsylvania
Tributaries of Fishing Creek (North Branch Susquehanna River)
Rivers of Pennsylvania